Synthetic Reaction Updates is a current awareness bibliographic database from the Royal Society of Chemistry that provides alerts of recently published developments in synthetic organic chemistry.

It covers primary research in general and organic chemistry published in chemistry journals. Each record contains a reaction scheme, as well as bibliographic data and a link to the original article on the publisher's website. Subscribers are able to search by topic and reaction type or register for email alerts of new content based on their search preferences.

History
The database was established in 2015 to replace the two discontinued databases Methods in Organic Synthesis  and Catalysts and Catalysed Reactions (.

Methods in Organic Synthesis was an online database that was established in 1998 and updated weekly with the latest developments in organic synthesis. It was also available as a monthly print bulletin.

Catalysts & Catalysed Reactions was a monthly current-awareness journal that was published from 2002 to 2014. It  covered the research areas of catalysed reactions and catalysts.

References

External links
 
 Methods in Organic Synthesis
 Catalysts & Catalysed Reactions

Chemical synthesis
Royal Society of Chemistry
Bibliographic databases and indexes
2015 establishments in the United Kingdom